Păltiniş is a mountain resort in Transylvania, Romania, 35 km south-west from Sibiu in the Cindrel Mountains.

It is situated at 1440 m altitude, being the highest resort in Romania. It lies in a conifer forest. It is a popular winter destination and in summer it is sought for its peacefulness, fresh air and easily accessible trekking routes.

It was founded by an association – Siebenbuergischer Karpatenverein (S.K.V.) – in 1894 and three villas from that period still exist. Currently there are 4 hotels, 6 chalets and 17 villas and an increasing number of private holiday houses.

At the entrance in the resort, there is a Romanian Orthodox monastery; the place where the Romanian philosopher Constantin Noica spent the last period of his lifetime.

Formally, it is a village administered by the city of Sibiu, although it lies on territory that is not contiguous with the city itself.

External links
 Photo Gallery Paltinis in the Summer
 Pictures and landscapes from the Carpathian Mountains
 City of Sibiu – Păltiniş Resort town
 Paltinis Photo Gallery – Pictures of the Păltiniş resort in winter
 

Sibiu
Ski areas and resorts in Romania
Geography of Sibiu County
Tourist attractions in Sibiu County